Azan may refer to:

People
 Ivan Asen I of Bulgaria r. 1189–1196 or his sons
 Ivan Asen II of Bulgaria r. 1218–1241
 Azan (Star Trek), Star Trek character
 Azan (mythology), character in Greek mythology
 Azan, nickname of American Twitch streamer and political commentator Hasan Piker (born 1991)

Places
 Azan, Afghanistan
 Azan, Isfahan, Iran
 Azan, Mazandaran, Iran

Other
 Adhan, also written as Azan, the Islamic call to prayer
 Azan (Az: Azocarmine and An: Aniline Blue WS), used in histology to distinguish cells from the extracellular matrix